The Batwal are a Suryavanshi Rajput clan found in the Indian states of Rajasthan, Madhya Pradesh, Maharashtra, Jammu and Kashmir, Punjab and Himachal Pradesh.

History  
In the State of Rajasthan, Madhya Pradesh and Maharashtra Batwals are land lord cultivators. Batwals of Jammu were tax collectors of Dogras. One traditions refer to the fact that the Batwal were tied to the land by the Dogra landowners. They are also cultivators like other hill communities and work as an attendants of Dogras who look after village guests, carry planquins of the bridegroom and bear torches. They are the followers of Sri Guru Gyagi Ji Maharaj & Bagwan Gotam Bhudha and were influenced by Arya Samaj prior to independence.

The Batwal are mainly found in Kathua, Samba, Udhampur, Reasi and Jammu districts in the Jammu region of Jammu and Kashmir, Gurdaspur, Pathankot and Hoshiarpur districts of Punjab and the Kangra and Chamba districts of Himachal Pradesh.

Present Circumstances
Like other neighbouring Hindu communities, the Batwals are strictly exogamous, never marrying within the clan. The major clans include the Kaith originated from Sialkot, Jhanjhotra and Molan from Zafarwal, Basae from Hyphasis, Chariya from Shimla, etc. They marry girls at young age but divorce and widow remarriage is permissible. Their marriage is officiated by Brahmin or Megh priest. They either burn or bury the dead bodies and take the ashes to Devika river at Purmandal village in Samba district.

Notable Batwals

Lal Chand Yamla Jatt, Punjabi folk singer
Ajay Sadhotra, minister and former deputy leader of opposition in J&K assembly

References  

Indian surnames
Hindu surnames
Punjabi tribes
Punjabi-language surnames
Dalit communities
Scheduled Castes of Jammu and Kashmir
Scheduled Castes of Punjab
Scheduled Castes of Himachal Pradesh
Scheduled Castes of Haryana
Social groups of Jammu and Kashmir
Social groups of Punjab, India